Jean Hansen (6 March 1932 – 12 April 1987) was a Danish cyclist. He competed in the 4,000 metres team pursuit event at the 1952 Summer Olympics.

References

External links
 

1932 births
1987 deaths
Danish male cyclists
Olympic cyclists of Denmark
Cyclists at the 1952 Summer Olympics
Cyclists from Copenhagen